Norovlin is a sum (district) of Khentii Province in eastern Mongolia. Bürenkhaan settlement is 40 km northwest of the Norovlin sum center. In 2010, its population was 2,254.

References 

Districts of Khentii Province